Monsal Dale railway station was opened in 1866 by the Midland Railway on its line from Rowsley, extending the Manchester, Buxton, Matlock and Midlands Junction Railway.

History
The original intention was merely to have a goods depot to serve the nearby Cressbrook Mill, to be called Cressbrook or Cressbrook Sidings.  However a passenger station would also serve the villages of Upperdale and Cressbrook.

The down line and platform was built on a shelf carved in the rock face, while the up was built on wooden trestles over the hillside. The wooden buildings for the latter were obtained from Evesham railway station.

Cut through solid limestone, they were both complex tunnels on a gradient of 1 in 100, and curved to allow the line to conform to the terrain.

It was written:

The station closed to regular passenger traffic in 1959 but continued to be used by occasional ramblers specials and excursions until April 1961. Trains continued to pass through the station until 1968 when the line was closed.

Today this section of line forms part of the Monsal Trail, an  walk and cycleway. The down platform edge can still be seen, but nothing remains of the up platform or timber buildings.  The tunnels previously mentioned were re-opened in 2011, and the previous path diversions over the river via a permissive path by Cressbrook Mill are still available.

Stationmasters

James Lister ca. 1867
Richard Coe ca. 1871–1873 (afterwards station master at Longstone)
J. Freer 1874 
J. Hudston 1874–1876 (afterwards station master at Chapel-en-le-Frith)
G. Barnett 1876–1880 (afterwards station master at Chorlton-cum-Hardy)
W. Daw 1880–1881 (afterwards station master at Warmley)
Richard Foskett 1881–1884 (afterwards station master at Blackwell)
William James 1884–1904 (afterwards station master at Tanhouse Lane, Widnes)
A.W. Jepson 1904–1906 
J. Greenbank from 1906 
H.R. Wilcox until 1909 (afterwards station master at Bugsworth)
Joseph Jennings 1909–ca. 1911
D.H. Jones ca. 1914
Mr. Tompkins ca. 1932
J.H. Adams 1944–1947 (afterwards station master at Radway Green)

From 1 October 1931 the stationmastership was merged with that of Longstone.

Route

References

Former Midland Railway stations
Railway stations in Great Britain opened in 1866
Railway stations in Great Britain closed in 1959
Disused railway stations in Derbyshire
1866 establishments in England